Condray is an unincorporated community in Dent County, in the U.S. state of Missouri.

History
A post office called Condray was established in 1886, and remained in operation until 1910. The community has the name of Thomas H. Condray, an officer at a nearby blast furnace.

References

Unincorporated communities in Dent County, Missouri
Unincorporated communities in Missouri